The Salina School, also known as the Salina Schoolhouse, is a one-room schoolbuilding in the former mining town of Salina in Boulder County, Colorado, built around 1875 or 1876. It was listed on the National Register of Historic Places in 1989.

Throughout the mining boom, the schoolhouse functioned as a hub of social activity in Salina, hosting dances, box socials, and other community activities.  Today the building is owned by the Salina Community Association, a nonprofit group of local residents, and maintained as a space for classes, films, concerts, and other community events.

References

School buildings completed in 1876
Buildings and structures in Boulder County, Colorado
Schools in Boulder County, Colorado
One-room schoolhouses in Colorado
School buildings on the National Register of Historic Places in Colorado
National Register of Historic Places in Boulder County, Colorado